Jeffery Matthew Taylor (born May 23, 1989) is a Swedish-American professional basketball player for BC Wolves of the Lithuanian Basketball League (LKL). He played college basketball for Vanderbilt University, before being drafted 31st overall by the Charlotte Bobcats in the 2012 NBA draft.

High school career
Considered a four-star recruit by Rivals.com, Taylor was listed as the No. 10 small forward and the No. 52 player in the nation in 2008.

College career
After Taylor's freshman season of 2008–09, DraftExpress.com said, "One of the most pleasant surprises in last season’s mediocre SEC [Southeastern Conference] was the emergence of Vanderbilt freshman Jeff Taylor." He averaged 12.2 points and 6.2 rebounds on his way to SEC All-Freshman honors. However, he showed one weakness in an otherwise solid season by shooting only 22 percent from three-point range.

His sophomore season saw some progress, but also some cause for concern; one scout said near the end of the season, "while he is improved in many areas, he has regressed in some as well." Taylor improved his scoring average to 13.3 per game, but his rebounding dropped slightly to 5.2 per game. The most obvious issue was his perimeter shooting, which saw a decline; he attempted only 11 three-pointers and made only one. Nonetheless, he was named to the All-SEC second team by the league's coaches, and was also named to the SEC All-Defensive Team.

In 2010–11, he further established his reputation as a defensive stopper, frequently being called on to defend every position on the floor except center while again being named to the SEC All-Defensive Team. Taylor also improved his three-point shooting to a more respectable 34.5% while attempting more than twice as many shots from behind the arc as in his first two seasons combined. Averaging 14.7 points and 5.5 rebounds, he was again named second-team All-SEC.

Taylor was widely viewed as a potential early entry into the 2011 NBA draft, based mainly on his athleticism and defensive skills. However, he decided to stay at Vanderbilt for his senior season in 2011–12. His decision to return, along with those of fellow stars John Jenkins and Festus Ezeli, made the Commodores a likely preseason top-10 pick.

Professional career

Charlotte Bobcats / Hornets (2012–2015)
Taylor was selected with 31st overall pick in the 2012 NBA draft by the Charlotte Bobcats. On July 13, 2012, he signed his first professional contract with the Bobcats.

On November 23, 2012, Taylor scored a career high 16 points in a 91–101 loss to the Atlanta Hawks.

On December 21, 2013, it was announced that Taylor would miss the remainder of the season with a torn right Achilles tendon. He had been averaging 8.0 points and 2.3 rebounds in 24.2 minutes per game.

After serving out his 24-game suspension by the NBA that was handed down to him in September 2014 for assaulting his girlfriend, Taylor was set to return to action with a stint in the NBA Development League with the Hornets' affiliate team, the Fort Wayne Mad Ants. However, with the maximum allowance of four NBA players already being on assignment to the Mad Ants, the flexible assignment rule was used on December 28, 2014 so the Hornets could assign Taylor to the Austin Spurs, the San Antonio Spurs' one-to-one D-League affiliate. He was recalled by the Hornets on January 9, 2015.

On June 30, 2015, the Hornets decided not to extend a qualifying offer to Taylor, thus making him an unrestricted free agent.

Real Madrid (2015–2022)
On August 27, 2015, Taylor signed a one-year deal with the Spanish team Real Madrid.

In May 2018, Real Madrid won the 2017–18 EuroLeague championship, after defeating Fenerbahçe Doğuş in the final game with 85–80. Over 34 EuroLeague games, Taylor averaged 5.9 points, 1.9 rebounds and 1.2 assists per game.

BC Wolves (2022–present)
On December 23, 2022, Taylor signed with BC Wolves of the Lithuanian Basketball League (LKL) until the end of the 2022–23 season.

Career statistics

College

|-
| style="text-align:left;"| 2008–09
| style="text-align:left;"| Vanderbilt
| 31 || 31 || 26.0 || .502 || .220 || .691 || 6.2 || 1.7 || .9 || .4 || 12.2
|-
| style="text-align:left;"| 2009–10
| style="text-align:left;"| Vanderbilt
| 33 || 33 || 26.8 || .493 || .091 || .746 || 5.2 || 1.7 || 1.1 || .4 || 13.3
|-
| style="text-align:left;"| 2010–11
| style="text-align:left;"| Vanderbilt
| 34 || 33 || 31.7 || .449 || .345 || .719 || 5.5 || 2.4 || 1.0 || .6 || 14.7
|-
| style="text-align:left;"| 2011–12
| style="text-align:left;"| Vanderbilt
| 36 || 36 || 32.1 || .493 || .423 || .605 || 5.6 || 1.7 || 1.3 || .4 || 16.1
|-

NBA

Regular season

|-
| align="left" | 
| align="left" | Charlotte
| 77 || 29 || 19.6 || .431 || .344 || .728 || 1.9 || .8 || .6 || .2 || 6.1
|-
| align="left" | 
| align="left" | Charlotte
| 26 || 8 || 24.2 || .376 || .269 || .553 || 2.3 || .8 || .5 || .2 || 8.0
|-
| align="left" | 
| align="left" | Charlotte
| 29 || 13 || 14.8 || .395 || .306 || .634 || 1.8 || .8 || .4 || .2 || 4.4
|- class="sortbottom"
| style="text-align:center;" colspan=2| Career
| 132 || 50 || 19.4 || .409 || .319 || .665 || 2.0 || .8 || .5 || .2 || 6.1

EuroLeague

|-
| style="text-align:left;"| 2015–16
| style="text-align:left;"| Real Madrid
| 25 || 3 || 15.2 || .473 || .323 || .611 || 2.1 || .5 || .2 || .1 || 4.3 || 2.6
|-
| style="text-align:left;"| 2016–17
| style="text-align:left;"| Real Madrid
| 30 || 22 || 15.5 || .500 || .392 || .667 || 1.8 || .5 || .4 || .1 || 4.6 || 3.6
|-
| style="text-align:left;background:#AFE6BA;"| 2017–18†
| style="text-align:left;"| Real Madrid
| 34 || 23 || 20.6 || .419 || .352 || .700 || 1.9 || 1.2 || .5 || .1 || 5.9 || 4.7
|-
| style="text-align:left;"| 2018–19
| style="text-align:left;"| Real Madrid
| 34 || 22 || 18.2 || .534 || .448 || .630 || 1.6 || 1.4 || .3 || .1 || 5.6 || 4.9
|-
| style="text-align:left;"| 2019–20
| style="text-align:left;"| Real Madrid
| 24 || 14 || 18.6 || .444 || .393 || .667 || 2.1 || 1.3 || .4 || .1 || 4.8 || 3.9

|- class="sortbottom"
| style="text-align:center;" colspan=2| Career
| 147 || 84 || 17.8 || .472 || .388 || .667 || 1.9 || 1.0 || .4 || .1 || 5.1 || 4.0

International career
Taylor participated in the 2013 edition of the EuroBasket. It was his first official appearance with the Swedish senior squad. He was Sweden's top scorer, averaging 21.2 points per game, along with 4.6 rebounds per game.

Personal life
Taylor is the second-oldest of the six children of Jeff Taylor, who briefly played in the NBA before playing in Sweden, where he lived until his death. While the younger Taylor is a citizen of both Sweden and the United States by birth, he played for Norrköping Dolphins youth team, and has lived in the U.S. since 2006, he has said, "...if someone asks where I'm from, I say Sweden." However, he grew up steeped in the basketball culture of Hobbs, New Mexico, where his father was a high school star in the late 1970s:

Taylor left Sweden for Hobbs in 2006, at the age of 17, moving in with his grandmother. Besides his desire to play at his father's alma mater, he determined that playing high school basketball in America would enhance his college basketball prospects. He quickly drew major interest from NCAA Division I programs, especially after a senior season when he averaged more than 30 points while leading Hobbs to a state title.

Taylor, named one of the top 150 recruits in the country by ESPN, considered about a half-dozen schools before narrowing his choices to Vanderbilt and Texas, eventually choosing Vanderbilt. He was one of three top-150 recruits signed by Commodores head coach Kevin Stallings in 2008.

Assault
On September 25, 2014, Taylor was arrested at a hotel in East Lansing, Michigan, charged with one count of domestic assault, assault, and malicious destruction of property. He was later suspended by the NBA for 24 games without pay after he pleaded guilty to the charges. He also received a one-year suspension from the Swedish national team.

References

External links

 Jeffery Taylor at acb.com 
 Jeffery Taylor at draftexpress.com
 Jeffery Taylor at eurobasket.com
 Jeffery Taylor at euroleague.net
 Jeffery Taylor at vucommodores.com
 

1989 births
Living people
American men's basketball players
Austin Spurs players
BC Wolves players
Charlotte Bobcats draft picks
Charlotte Bobcats players
Charlotte Hornets players
Hobbs High School alumni
Liga ACB players
National Basketball Association players from Sweden
Sportspeople from Norrköping
Real Madrid Baloncesto players
Shooting guards
Small forwards
Swedish expatriate basketball people in Lithuania
Swedish expatriate basketball people in Spain
Swedish men's basketball players
Swedish people of African-American descent
Vanderbilt Commodores men's basketball players